Seo Young (born June 21, 1984) is a South Korean actress. She debuted in the 2006 Munhwa Broadcasting Corporation (MBC) drama What's Up Fox. In 2010, she started her own clothing store called Shine S.

Career

Debut: 2006-2007
Starring in the OCN four-part series Temptation of Eve, she appeared in Her Own Art (or Technique) which was the fourth part.

2008-2010
In a spin-off of 1 Night 2 Days, she appeared alongside Kim Sook, Yoo Chae-yeong, Kim Yi-ji and Mi-ra in 1 Night 2 Days of Beauty. A Tale of Legendary Libido: Appeared in the movie A Tale of Legendary Libido as Dan-bi, one of the many women trying to seduce the main character in the village

2011-present
She was cast as Mi-ra in the movie Wonderful Radio.

Filmography

Films
 2007: Temptation of Eve: Her Own Art  - Hye-young 
 2007: The Worst Man of My Life
 2008: A Tale of Legendary Libido - Dan-bi 
 2011: Wonderful Radio - Mi-ra

Television series
 2006: What's Up Fox - Lee Joo-hee
 2007: Dal-ja's Spring
 2007: Sexi Mong   - Oh Seon-jung
 2008: Seo Young's Spy
 2010: Wish Upon a Star - Min-ah
 2010: Roller Coaster Plus Date Big Bang - Seo-young
 2010: Yaksha - Ji-hyang
 2016: Dr. Romantic - Chairman Shin's assistant
 2017: Manhole - Mi-ja
 2020: Dr. Romantic 2 - Manager Joo (Ep. 15 & 16)

Variety shows
 2009: 1 Night 2 Days of Beauty

References

External links

Shine S - Official Fan Cafe

1984 births
Living people
Actresses from Seoul
South Korean television personalities
Chung-Ang University alumni
South Korean television actresses
South Korean film actresses